Guadalupe County is the name of several counties in the United States:

 Guadalupe County, New Mexico 
 Guadalupe County, Texas